Romania competed at the 1996 Summer Olympics in Atlanta, United States. 165 competitors, 98 men and 67 women, took part in 122 events in 18 sports.

Medalists

|  style="text-align:left; width:72%; vertical-align:top;"|

| style="text-align:left; width:23%; vertical-align:top;"|

Athletics

Men's 1,500 metres 
 Ovidiu Olteanu
 Qualification — 3:38.33 (→ did not advance)

Men's 400m Hurdles
 Mugur Mateescu 
 Heat — 49.97s (→ did not advance)

Men's 3,000 metres Steeplechase
Florin Ionescu
 Heat — 8:31.34 
 Semifinals — 8:28.77 (→ did not advance)

Men's Long Jump
 Bogdan Tarus
 Qualification — 7.96m (→ did not advance)

 Bogdan Tudor
 Qualification — 7.88m (→ did not advance)

Men's Discus Throw 
 Costel Grasu
 Qualification — 58.56m (→ did not advance)

Men's 20 km Walk
 Costică Bălan

Women's 10.000 metres 
 Iulia Negura
 Qualification — 31:40.16
 Final — 31:26.46 (→ 8th place)

Women's 400m Hurdles
 Ionela Târlea
 Qualification — 55.42
 Semifinals — 54.41
 Final — 54.40 (→ 7th place)

Women's Javelin Throw
 Felicia Tilea
 Qualification — 66.94m
 Final — 59.94m (→ 10th place)

Women's Discus Throw 
 Nicole Grasu
 Qualification — 63.00m
 Final — 63.28m (→ 7th place)

 Cristina Boit
 Qualification — 58.10m (→ did not advance)

Women's Long Jump
Mihaela Gheorghiu
 Qualification — NM (→ did not advance)

Women's Triple Jump
 Rodica Mateescu
 Qualification — 14.22m
 Final — 14.21m (→ 8th place)

Women's Heptathlon 
 Liliana Nastase
 Final Result — 5847 points (→ 22nd place)

Women's Marathon
 Lidia Șimon — 2:31.04 (→ 6th place)
 Anuța Cătună — 2:42.01 (→ 44th place)
 Cristina Pomacu — did not finish (→ no ranking)

Women's 10 km Walk
 Norica Câmpean — 46:19 (→ 29th place)

Boxing

Men's Light Flyweight (– 48 kg)
Sabin Bornei
 First Round — Defeated José Pérez Reyes (Dominican Republic), 16-10 
 Second Round — Lost to Somrot Kamsing (Thailand), 7-18

Men's Bantamweight (– 54 kg)
George Olteanu
 First Round — Defeated Samuel Álvarez (Mexico), referee stopped contest in third round
 Second Round — Defeated Kalai Riadh (Tunisia), 16-3 
 Quarter Finals — Lost to István Kovács (Hungary), 2-24

Men's Lightweight (– 60 kg)
Leonard Doroftei →  Bronze Medal
 First Round — Defeated Julio Mboumba (Gabon), referee stopped contest in second round
 Second Round — Defeated Sergey Kopenkin (Kyrgyzstan), 10-1 
 Quarter Finals — Defeated Koba Gogoladze (Georgia), 17-8 
 Semi Finals — Lost to Hocine Soltani (Algeria), 6-9

Men's Lightweight (– 67 kg)
Marian Simion →  Bronze Medal
 First Round — Defeated Hussein Bayram (France), 13-6 
 Second Round — Defeated Fernando Vargas (United States), 8-7 
 Quarter Finals — Defeated Hasan Al (Denmark), 16-8 
 Semi Finals — Lost to Juan Hernández Sierra (Cuba), 7-20

Men's Light Middleweight (– 71 kg)
Francisc Vaștag
 First Round — Lost to Markus Beyer (Germany), 12-17

Men's Heavyweight (– 91 kg)
Ovidiu Bali
 First Round — Bye
 Second Round — Lost to Christophe Mendy (France), referee stopped contest in second round

Canoeing

Diving

Women's 10m Platform
Clara Elena Ciocan
 Preliminary Heat — 281.52 
 Semi Final — 157.41
 Final — 256.05 (→ 10th place)

Anisoara Opriea
 Preliminary Heat — 233.34 (→ did not advance, 22nd place)

Fencing

Nine fencers, six men and three women, represented Romania in 1996.

Men's épée
 Gheorghe Epurescu
 Gabriel Pantelimon
 Aurel Bratu

Men's team épée
 Aurel Bratu, Gheorghe Epurescu, Gabriel Pantelimon

Men's sabre
 Vilmoș Szabo
 Florin Lupeică
 Mihai Covaliu

Men's team sabre
 Florin Lupeică, Mihai Covaliu, Vilmoș Szabo

Women's foil
 Laura Cârlescu-Badea
 Roxana Scarlat
 Reka Zsofia Lazăr-Szabo

Women's team foil
 Laura Cârlescu-Badea, Reka Zsofia Lazăr-Szabo, Roxana Scarlat

Gymnastics

Judo

Modern pentathlon

Men's Individual Competition
 Adrian Toader — 5335 pts (→ 14th place)

Rhythmic gymnastics

Rowing

Sailing

Shooting

Swimming

Men's 100 m Freestyle
Nicolae Ivan
 Heat — 51.14 (→ did not advance, 30th place)

Men's 200 m Freestyle
Nicolae Butacu
 Heat — 1:50.83
 B-Final — 1:51.46 (→ 16th place)

Men's 100 m Backstroke
Nicolae Butacu
 Heat — 56.73 (→ did not advance, 21st place)

Men's 200 m Backstroke
Nicolae Butacu
 Heat — 2:08.59 (→ did not advance, 34th place)

Men's 100 m Butterfly
Răzvan Petcu
 Heat — 55.50 (→ did not advance, 35th place)

Men's 4 × 100 m Freestyle Relay
Nicolae Ivan, Răzvan Petcu, Horațiu Badiță, and Alexandru Ioanovici
 Heat — 3:21.66 (→ did not advance, 10th place)

Women's 50 m Freestyle
Luminița Dobrescu
 Heat — 26.47 (→ did not advance, 27th place)

Women's 100 m Freestyle
Luminița Dobrescu
 Heat — 56.27 
 B-Final — 55.98 (→ 11th place)

Women's 200 m Freestyle
Luminița Dobrescu
 Heat — 2:00.85 
 Final — 2:01.63 (→ 8th place)

Ioana Diaconescu
 Heat — 2:04.59 (→ did not advance, 25th place)

Women's 400 m Freestyle
Carla Negrea
 Heat — 4:16.89
 B-Final — 4:17.08 (→ 16th place)
             
Women's 800 m Freestyle
Carla Negrea
 Heat — 8:54.19 (→ did not advance, 20th place)
          
Women's 200 m Backstroke
Cătălina Căsaru
 Heat — 2:15.92
 B-Final — 2:15.15 (→ 14th place)

Women's 100 m Breaststroke
Larisa Lăcustă
 Heat — 1:13.91 (→ did not advance, 35th place)

Women's 100 m Butterfly
Loredana Zisu
 Heat — 1:02.66 (→ did not advance, 23rd place)

Women's 200 m Butterfly
Loredana Zisu
 Heat — 2:17.56 (→ did not advance, 21st place)

Women's 200 m Individual Medley
Beatrice Câșlaru
 Heat — 2:16.80 
 B-Final — 2:16.75 (→ 12th place)

Women's 400 m Individual Medley
Beatrice Câșlaru
 Heat — 4:44.66
 Final — 4:44.91 (→ 6th place)

Women's 4 × 100 m Freestyle Relay
Ioana Diaconescu, Florina Herea, Andrea Trufașu, and Luminița Dobrescu
 Heat – 3:48.43 (→ did not advance, 11th place)

Women's 4 × 200 m Freestyle Relay
Luminița Dobrescu, Loredana Zisu, Ioana Diaconescu, and Carla Negrea
 Heat – 8:10.77
 Final – 8:10.02 (→ 7th place)

Women's 4 × 100 m Medley Relay
Catalina Căsaru, Beatrice Câșlaru, Loredana Zisu, and Luminița Dobrescu
 Heat – 4:16.18 (→ did not advance, 17th place)

Table tennis

Tennis

Women's Singles Competition
 Cătălina Cristea
 First round — Lost to Anke Huber (Germany) 6-2 4-6 2-6

 Ruxandra Dragomir
 First round — Lost to Jana Novotná (Czech Republic) 4-6 4-4 retired

Water polo

Men's team competition
Preliminary round (group B)
 Romania – Ukraine 6-6
 Romania – Croatia 6-11
 Romania – Greece 5-8
 Romania – United States 5-10
 Romania – Italy 9-10
Classification Matches
 9th/12th place: Romania – Netherlands 8-10
 9th/12th place: Romania – Ukraine 11-8
 9th/12th place: Romania – Germany 6-10 (→ Eleventh place)

Team roster
Edward Andrei
Florin Bonca
Robert Dinu
Niculae Fulgeanu 
Vlad Hagiu
Gelu Lisac 
Istvan Moldvai 
Daniel Radu
Bogdan Rath
Radu Sabău 
Stefan Sanda 
Dinel Stemate
Liviu Totolici
Head coach: Rus Viorel

Weightlifting

Men's 108 kg
Nicu Vlad  
Snatch — 197.5 kg
Clean & Jerk — 222.5 kg
Total — 420.0 kg (→  Bronze Medal)

Wrestling

Notes

References

Nations at the 1996 Summer Olympics
1996
O